David Oliver Joyce (born 12 February 1987) is an Irish professional boxer. As an amateur, he won gold medals at the 2008, 2009 and 2014 European Union Championships, and competed at the 2016 Summer Olympics.

Personal life
Joyce was born into a boxing family in Mullingar, Co. Westmeath. His cousins John Joe Joyce and Joe Ward are also international boxers. Joyce is married to Melissa and has three children: Amber, Mickey Joe and Reanna.

Amateur career
In April 2016, he qualified for the 2016 Summer Olympics in Rio de Janeiro, beating Volkan Gockek on points in a fight in Turkey. He reached the last sixteen of the men's lightweight competition, defeating Andrique Allisop in a first round bout by unanimous decision.

Professional career
Joyce made his professional debut on 7 June 2017, at the Waterfront Hall in Belfast. In a six-round bout against Gabor Kovacs, he won via second round technical knockout (TKO).

Professional boxing record

References

Boxers at the 2016 Summer Olympics
Olympic boxers of Ireland
Irish male boxers
1987 births
Living people
People from Mullingar
Featherweight boxers